Haukeland University Hospital is a hospital in Bergen, Norway, and one of the eleven institutions that make up Bergen Hospital Trust. Haukeland is the largest in Norway in terms of number of patients, and serves as the local hospital of Bergen, Midthordland and Nordhordland, the central hospital of Vestland county, and the regional hospital for Vestland and Rogaland counties.

They have a co-operation with the University of Bergen, including the Gades Institute of Pathology. The Hospital is the greatest employer in Hordaland, in terms of number of employees. Haukeland is a national special hospital and resource center for Burn injuries, air-pressure injuries (diving), Cornea-protesises and treatment of intercranial tumors. It is the site of RELIS.

Application for distribution of heroin
The hospital's 2013 application for distributing heroin for free, was the first ever by a Norwegian hospital. Distribution is planned at the proposed supervised injection site at the new emergency department at Solheimsviken. Such injection sites have not been permitted by the city council, although the hospital trust may independent of this implement injection rooms.

Heliport

Bergen received a helicopter air ambulance service in 1987, operated by Norsk Luftambulanse. This service was initially based at the "Circus lot" at Nygårdstangen. When the central block was built during the 1980s, there were originally plans to place a helipad on the roof. However, there was uncertainty if there was sufficient support in the structure and the plans were therefore aborted. Haukeland was the only major hospital without a suitable heliport on-site. They had a temporary structure, although it did not allow good landing conditions and was considered hazardous for flight safety. Only in cases where saving a few minutes was imperative did helicopters call directly at the hospital. The facility lack authorization from the Civil Aviation Authority of Norway, and could only be used on a case-for-case basis when the physician declared necessity.

The heliport lot at Nygårdstangen was sold in 2002, and replaced with Bergen Heliport, Grønneviksøren. At the same time Haukeland took over the medical air ambulance staff. The Civil Aviation Authority approved the design and construction of an on-site helipad in 2004, but not until 2008 did Bergen Hospital Trust approve the plans. The official opening of the new pad took place on 12 April 2012.

Laboratory clinic 

The new laboratory building opened in 2010. The building lies in the East side of the central building, with a pedestrian bridge connecting the two. In this building, every laboratory field except pathology is located, and the building features a blood bank as well as RELIS, Norway's drug information centre. With its 23 000 square metres, the laboratory building is the largest building raised at Haukeland University Hospital since the central building.

References

Hospital buildings completed in 1912
Hospitals in Norway
Buildings and structures in Bergen
Hospitals established in 1912
1912 establishments in Norway
Hordaland County Municipality
Heliports in Norway
Airports in Vestland